The Roman Catholic Diocese of Ndalatando is a diocese located in the city of Ndalatando in the Ecclesiastical province of Malanje in Angola.

History
 3 March 1990: Established as Diocese of Ndalatando from the Metropolitan Archdiocese of Luanda

Special churches
The Cathedral of the diocese is Sé Catedral de São João Baptista in N'Dalatando.

Leadership
 Bishops of Ndalatando (Roman rite), in reverse chronological order
 Bishop Almeida Kanda (since 23 July 2005)
 Bishop Pedro Luís Guido Scarpa, O.F.M. Cap. (26 March 1990  – 23 July 2005)

See also
Roman Catholicism in Angola

Sources
 GCatholic.org

Roman Catholic dioceses in Angola
Christian organizations established in 1990
Roman Catholic dioceses and prelatures established in the 20th century
Ndalatando, Roman Catholic Diocese of
Roman Catholic bishops of Ndalatando